Zarqan County is in Fars province, Iran. The capital of the county is the city of Zarqan. At the 2006 census, the region's population (as Zarqan District of Shiraz County) was 46,672 in 11,815 households. The following census in 2011 counted 52,065 people in 14,240 households. At the 2016 census, the district's population was 56,104 in 16,672 households. It was separated from Shiraz County in 2018 to form Zarqan County.

Administrative divisions

The population history of Zarqan County's administrative divisions (as Zarqan District in Shiraz County) over three consecutive censuses is shown in the following table.

References

 

Counties of Fars Province